Caelostomus kaszabi is a species of ground beetle in the subfamily Pterostichinae. It was described by Jedlicka in 1954.

References

Caelostomus
Beetles described in 1954